Muraglitazar (proposed tradename Pargluva) is a dual peroxisome proliferator-activated receptor agonist with affinity to PPARα and PPARγ.

The drug had completed phase III clinical trials, however in May, 2006  Bristol-Myers Squibb announced that it had discontinued  further development.

Data on muraglitazar is relatively sparse due to the recent introduction of this agent. One double-blind randomized clinical trial comparing muraglitazar and pioglitazone found that the effects of the former were favourable in terms of HDL-C increase, decrease in total cholesterol, apolipoprotein B, triglycerides and a greater reduction in HbA1c (p <0.0001 for all comparisons). However, the muraglitazar group had a higher all-cause mortality, greater incidence of edema and heart failure and more weight gain compared to the pioglitazone group. A meta-analysis of the phase II and III clinical trials of muraglitazar revealed that it was associated with a greater incidence of myocardial infarction, stroke, transient ischemic attacks and congestive heart failure (CHF) when compared to placebo or pioglitazone.

By calling attention to adverse events made public through the FDA advisory committee process, Dr Nissen came upon a mechanism to steer FDA from the outside. This mechanism came to fruition with rosiglitazone (Avandia)and led to FDA requiring demonstration of cardiac safety for new drugs to treat type 2 diabetes. This process is described by Dr Robert Misbin in INSULIN-History from an FDA Insider, published June 1, 2020 on Amazon.

References 

Abandoned drugs
Oxazoles
Carbamates
Phenol ethers
PPAR agonists